Miners Hill is a coming of age novel by the American writer Michael O'Malley set during the 1930s and 1940s in the fictional locale of Brasston, a steel town on the Monongahela River twenty miles south of Pittsburgh, Pennsylvania.

It tells the story of Pat Riley, whose mother would have him escape the life of the mills by entering the priesthood of the Roman Catholic Church.

References
 William C. Fitzgibbon (1962). New York Times: Book Review of Miners Hill. Retrieved November 13, 2008.

1962 American novels
Novels set in Pennsylvania
Catholic novels